Aric Long (born April 15, 1970) is an American athlete. He competed in the men's decathlon at the 1992 Summer Olympics.

References

1970 births
Living people
Athletes (track and field) at the 1992 Summer Olympics
American male decathletes
Olympic track and field athletes of the United States
People from East Liverpool, Ohio
Track and field athletes from Ohio